Ulrik Reinaldo Berglann (born 31 May 1992 in Nesna) is a Norwegian football winger who currently plays for Lyn.

Career
Berglann joined the first team in 2011 after impressing at Bodø/Glimt 2.

He made his first-tier debut as a substitute against Stabæk in April 2014.

On 7 July 2015, Berglann joined Strømmen on loan until the end of the season.

Career statistics

Club

Notes

References

1992 births
Living people
People from Nesna
Norwegian footballers
FK Bodø/Glimt players
Strømmen IF players
FK Jerv players
Arendal Fotball players
Lyn Fotball players
Norwegian First Division players
Eliteserien players
Association football midfielders
Sportspeople from Nordland